William B. Crawley, Jr. is a Distinguished Professor of History and Historian at the University of Mary Washington in Fredericksburg, Virginia. He is the director of the Great Lives program and teaches the course Great Lives: Biographical Approaches to History and Culture. His primary teaching fields are recent American history and history of the South.

Biography 
Crawley earned a B.A. in history from Hampden-Sydney college. As well as a M.A and a Ph. D from the University of Virginia. Afterwards, in 1970, he went on to become a professor at the University of Mary Washington for 40 years. While there, he earned several awards for distinguished teaching and skill in administrative positions. Currently he is the Distinguished Professor Emeritus of History. In 1978 he wrote Bill Tuck: A Political Life in Harry Byrd's Virginia, which is held in several hundred libraries. In 1994 he received the Grellet C. Simpson Award for outstanding teaching. By 2005, the graduating seniors chose him for the Mary W. Pinschmidt Award as the professor who had the greatest impact on students’ lives. In 2008 he wrote the Centennial History of The University of Mary Washington.

References

University of Mary Washington people
Year of birth missing (living people)
Living people